The following is a list of the 69 municipalities (comuni) of the Province of Savona, Liguria, Italy.

List

See also 
List of municipalities of Italy

References 

Savona